At the 1908 Summer Olympics, three motorboat racing events were contested. Various sources refer to the sport as "water motorsports", "motor boats", and "power boating". The 1900 and 1908 Summer Games were the only ones to feature motorised sports (motor racing was featured in 1900). The IOC has never decided which events were "Olympic" and which were not.

In each of the events, multiple boats started; however, only one finished due primarily to the gale that was blowing during the course of the competition. Events were held on 28 August and 29 August 1908.

Medal summary

The water motorsports event was quickly abolished, because after these games the IOC decided that the Olympics was not intended for motorized competition.

Participating nations
17 boaters from 2 nations competed.

Medal table
Sources:

Events

Class A — Open class

The open class was scheduled to take place on the first day of competition, 28 August. Two boats, Wolseley-Siddely and Dylan, began the race. Dylan abandoned the race partway through the first lap, with Wolseley-Siddely finishing first before the weather became too severe to continue the race.

A second attempt to run the event took place the next day after the other two races had been completed. Wolseley-Siddely again started, this time against Camille (the only French boat to take part in competition). Wolseley-Siddely ran aground on a mud spit, leaving Camille to finish alone for the gold medal.

Class B — Under 60 feet

The B class was held on 28 August after the abortive first running of the open class. Again, only two boats appeared at the starting line: Quicksilver and Gyrinus. Quicksilver became threatened by water coming in over the sides, abandoning the race. Gyrinus, a small boat with an extra crewman to bail water, was able to finish to make its crew the first Olympic champions in motorsports. Gyrinus was the earliest round-bilge Semi-Planing Mono-Hull ('SPMH') designed by Sir John Isaac Thornycroft FRS, the great Victorian engineer, previously the designer and builder of the world's first torpedo boats and torpedo boat 'Destroyers'. Development of the technical features of Gyrinus (combining speed with good seaworthiness, as demonstrated in the 1908 Olympics) was described in 'Engineering', the Proceedings of the Society of Civil Engineers, on March 12, 1909. His son, Isaac Thomas Thornycroft, the Gyrinus helmsman, became a yacht designer and helmsman of J-Class racing yachts. Thomas's son, Commander Peter Thornycroft (1914–1987), carried on the family tradition, developing the SPMH as the standard Nelson Class of Pilot Boat for Trinity House (1964 to 1987) and, later, up to much larger sizes of offshore patrol vessels. The US Navy's 350 ft./114-metre/3,200-ton/45-knot USS Freedom is the largest SPMH launched to date (2006). It combines a higher speed-for-length than would be possible with a conventional destroyer hull, good seakeeping at speed, and a high payload—characteristics that enabled the little Gyrinus to win her famous Olympic victories.

Class C — 6.5–8 metres

The first race of 29 August was the small class of boats. Gyrinus, which had won the B class the day before, appeared again. This time her competition was Sea Dog. Again, however, Gyrinus was the only boat to finish, as Sea Dog experienced engine problems and had to be towed off the course.

Crew lists

France

Camille
 Emile Thubron

Great Britain

Dylan
 Thomas Scott-Ellis
 A. G. Fentiman

Gyrinus
 Isaac Thomas Thornycroft
 Bernard Boverton Redwood
 John Field-Richards

Quicksilver
 John Marshall Gorham
 Sophia Hope Gorham

Sea Dog
 Warwick Wright
 Thomas Weston

Wolseley-Siddely
 Hugh Grosvenor
 George Clowes
 Joseph Frederick Laycock (first race only)
 G. H. Atkinson (second race only)

See also
List of Olympic venues in discontinued events

References

Sources

External links
 

 
1908 in boat racing
1908 Summer Olympics events
Water motorsports at the Summer Olympics